Various albums, singles, and other songs have been affiliated with the Drag Race franchise.

RuPaul's Drag Race

Albums

Extended plays

Singles

RuPaul's Drag Race All Stars

Singles

RuPaul's Drag Race UK

Singles

RuPaul's Secret Celebrity Drag Race

Singles

Canada's Drag Race

Singles

Lip Sync performances

RuPaul's Drag Race

RuPaul's Drag Race All Stars

Drag Race Thailand

RuPaul's Drag Race Holi-Slay Spectacular

RuPaul's Drag Race UK

RuPaul's Secret Celebrity Drag Race

Canada's Drag Race

Drag Race Holland

RuPaul's Drag Race Down Under

Drag Race Philippines

Notes

Reference section 

Discography
Film and television discographies